"Blue Christmas" is a Christmas song written by Billy Hayes and Jay W. Johnson and most famously performed by Elvis Presley; it was first recorded by Doye O'Dell in 1948. It is a tale of unrequited love during the holidays and is a longstanding staple of Christmas music, especially in the country genre.

History

Initial recordings and major versions

The song was first recorded by Doye O'Dell in 1948, and was popularized the following year in three separate recordings: one by country artist Ernest Tubb, one by musical conductor and arranger Hugo Winterhalter and his orchestra and chorus, and one by bandleader Russ Morgan and his orchestra (the latter featuring lead vocals by Morgan and backing vocals by singers credited as the Morganaires).  Tubb's version spent the first week of January 1950 at No. 1 on Billboard magazine's Most-Played Juke Box (Country & Western) Records chart, while Winterhalter's version peaked at No. 9 on Billboard's Records Most Played by Disk Jockeys chart and Morgan's version reached No. 11 on Billboard's Best-Selling Pop Singles chart. Both Morgan's and Winterhalter's versions featured a shorter pop edit of the original lyrics. Also in 1950 crooner Billy Eckstine recorded his rendition, backed by the orchestra of Russ Case, with these shortened lyrics in a variation close to what is now the common standard for this song; the orchestral backing of this recording has often been wrongly accredited to Winterhalter.

Elvis Presley cemented the status of "Blue Christmas" as a rock-and-roll holiday classic by recording it for his 1957 LP Elvis' Christmas Album.  Presley's version is notable musicologically as well as culturally in that the vocal group the Jordanaires (especially in the soprano line, sung by Millie Kirkham) replace many major and just minor thirds with neutral and septimal minor thirds, respectively.  In addition to contributing to the overall tone of the song, the resulting "blue notes" constitute a musical play on words that provides an "inside joke" or "quail egg" to trained ears. "Blue Christmas" was also included on a 1957 45 EP (Extended Play) entitled Elvis Sings Christmas Songs (EPA-4108), which also included "Santa Bring My Baby Back (To Me)" on side one, with "Santa Claus Is Back in Town" and "I'll Be Home for Christmas" on side two.  Presley's original 1957 version was released as a commercially available single for the first time in 1964. This single was also a hit in the United Kingdom, reaching No. 11 on the British singles chart during the week of December 26, 1964.

On January 1, 2021, the British Phonographic Industry certified the single with a Gold award, reflecting sales in the UK in excess of 400,000 copies since its release in 2004. On Billboard magazine's January 5, 2019 edition, the song reached the #40 position inside the Billboard Hot 100, the latter for the first time since its release in 1964.

The rock band The Beach Boys recorded a version featuring Brian Wilson on lead vocals, releasing it in the United States on November 16, 1964, in two separate formats simultaneously:
(a) the B-side of "The Man with All the Toys" single.
(b) a track on The Beach Boys' Christmas Album.

The song also appears in the 1974 Rankin/Bass animated special, The Year Without a Santa Claus.  In the cartoon, Santa is considering skipping Christmas one year, thinking no one believes in him, and there is very little good will on the planet.  Children around the world respond by sending Santa presents, and one little girl sends him a letter, telling Santa it will be a "blue Christmas" without him, while the song plays, and is sung by a little girl.

Personnel

Elvis Presley versions

Original 1957 version
Sourced from Keith Flynn.
 Elvis Presley – lead vocals, acoustic rhythm guitar
 Scotty Moore – lead guitar
 Bill Black – bass
 D. J. Fontana – drums
 Dudley Brooks – piano
 The Jordanaires – backing vocals
 Millie Kirkham – backing vocals

1968 live version
Sourced from Keith Flynn.
 Elvis Presley – lead vocals, electric rhythm/lead guitar
 Scotty Moore – acoustic rhythm guitar
 Charlie Hodge – backing vocals, acoustic rhythm guitar
 D. J. Fontana – percussion 
 Alan Fortas – percussion 
 Lance LeGault – tambourine, possible backing vocals

Other charting versions 

 1960: The Browns' version peaked at No. 97 on the Billboard Hot 100 singles chart in December 1960.
 2022: Kane Brown's version peaked at No. 73 on the Billboard Hot 100 in January 2023.

Charts

Certifications

References

External links
 Music video featuring Elvis Presley and a superimposed Martina McBride

1948 songs
1964 singles
American Christmas songs
Elvis Presley songs
The Beach Boys songs
Andrea Bocelli songs
Capitol Records singles
Ernest Tubb songs
RCA Victor singles
Rockabilly songs
Song recordings produced by Brian Wilson
The Browns songs
The Partridge Family songs
Torch songs
Music published by MPL Music Publishing